Helga Flatland  ( born 16 September 1984) is a Norwegian novelist and children's writer. Making her literary debut in 2010, she eventually became a full-time writer, and has won prizes such as Tarjei Vesaas' debutantpris, Mads Wiel Nygaard's Endowment and the Norwegian Booksellers' Prize.

Early and personal life
Flatland was born in Notodden and grew up in Flatdal. She graduated in Scandinavian literature and language from the University of Oslo, and has also studied at Westerdals School of Communication. She worked with information advisory until she became a full-time writer.

Literary career
Flatland made her literary debut in 2010 with the novel Bli hvis du kan. Reis hvis du må, for which she was awarded the Tarjei Vesaas' debutantpris. The novel was the first in a trilogy about "Tarjei", "Trygve" and "Kristian" who were recruited as soldiers to the war in Afghanistan, and was followed by Alle vil hjem. Ingen vil tilbake (2012) and Det finnes ingen helhet (2013).

The sequel, Eline overnatter, was released in 2016.

Her novel Vingebelastning treats themes such as self-realization and expectations of happiness. En moderne familie is about a family where the parents decide to divorce in their early 70s, and how this affects their grown-up children. The novel earned Flatland the Norwegian Booksellers' Prize for 2017. In 2020 she released the novel Et liv forbi, which treats themes related to severe illness within a family. An audiobook version is voiced by Liv Bernhoft Osa and Ane Dahl Torp.

Bibliography

Novels

Children's books

References

1984 births
Living people
People from Notodden
People from Seljord
University of Oslo alumni
Norwegian women novelists
21st-century Norwegian novelists
Norwegian children's writers
21st-century Norwegian women writers